Orešac is a village in Serbia. It is situated in the Vršac municipality, in the South Banat District, Vojvodina province.

Ethnic groups (2002 census)
The village is ethnically mixed and its population numbering 356 people (2011 census).

The population of the village include:
 196 (46.67%) Romanians
 171 (40.71%) Serbs
 41 (9.76%) Romani
 others.

Historical population

1961: 813
1971: 738
1981: 647
1991: 570
2002: 420

References
Slobodan Ćurčić, Broj stanovnika Vojvodine, Novi Sad, 1996.

See also
List of places in Serbia
List of cities, towns and villages in Vojvodina

Vršac
Populated places in Serbian Banat
Populated places in South Banat District
Romanian communities in Serbia